Geoffrey Cecil Burridge (4 December 1948 – 30 September 1987) was an English actor noted for his performances in theatre and television.

On television, he appeared as Mark Proctor in early episodes of Emmerdale Farm and is also remembered for his guest appearance in Blake's 7 (as Dorian in the episode "Rescue").

In John Landis's 1981 film An American Werewolf in London, he appeared as the undead murdered man with his fiancée in the sex cinema scene. He also appeared in the 1978 BBC TV drama by Derek Lister The Ice House as one of the main characters, Clovis and in the same year made a guest appearance in the series 1990 as American chess champion Cyrus Asher in the episode "You'll Never Walk Alone". 

His extensive theatre credits included many musicals, notably the 1972 West End revue, Cowardy Custard, the 1978 production of Beyond the Rainbow in the West End and the 1985 revival of Gigi.

He died in London from an AIDS-related illness in 1987, leaving a partner, the actor Alec McCowen, who refused to appear on This Is Your Life unless the relationship was acknowledged.

Filmography

References

External links

1948 births
1987 deaths
English male stage actors
English male film actors
English male television actors
AIDS-related deaths in England
English gay actors
English LGBT actors
20th-century English male actors
20th-century English LGBT people